The Netherlands cricket team toured South Africa in November and December 2021 to play three One Day International (ODI) matches. The ODI series formed part of the inaugural 2020–2023 ICC Cricket World Cup Super League. The teams last played each other in May 2013, with South Africa winning a one-off ODI match. The tour was the first time that the two teams played each other in South Africa.

In late November 2021, a new variant of the COVID-19 virus was discovered in southern Africa. Initial reports stated that the tour had been called off during the morning of the first ODI, but flights to the Netherlands had been suspended until at least 3 December 2021. The following day, the second and third ODIs were officially postponed due to concerns around the new variant. The first ODI finished in a no result due to rain, after only two overs of the Dutch run chase. Both cricket boards were looking at rescheduling the matches within the current cycle of the Future Tours Programme.

Netherlands will again tour South Africa from 31 March to 2 April 2023 to play the remaining two ODIs that were postponed.

Squads

For the first ODI, Lizaad Williams was ruled out of South Africa's squad due to an injury and Lungi Ngidi was also ruled out of South Africa's squad following a positive COVID-19 test, with Junior Dala named as his replacement.

ODI series

1st ODI

2nd ODI

3rd ODI

References

External links
 Series home at ESPNcricinfo (Original tour)
 Series home at ESPNcricinfo (Rescheduled tour)

2021 in South African cricket
2021 in Dutch cricket
2023 in South African cricket
2023 in Dutch cricket
International cricket competitions in 2021–22
International cricket competitions in 2022–23
Netherlands
South Africa
Cricket events curtailed due to the COVID-19 pandemic